Ancyroclepsis nakhasathieni is a species of moth of the family Tortricidae. It is found in Thailand.

References

Moths described in 1995
Archipini
Moths of Asia
Taxa named by Kevin Tuck